The 64th NHK Red & White Year-End Song Festival (第64回NHK紅白歌合戦) was aired on December 31, 2013. This edition's theme was "歌がここにある" ("Uta ga Koko ni Aru", "The Song Is Here") and the captains were Arashi (Shirogumi) and Haruka Ayase (Akagumi). This was the 25th edition on Heisei Era. The most notable highlights from this edition were the Amachan special segment, Yuko Oshima's surprise graduation announcement during AKB48 performance, and final performance from Saburo Kitajima who announced an honorable retirement from Kouhaku after 50 performances.

For the second time (since 2012), the  won this event, this time using a ball system. The final score was 4-9 (Shirogumi wins).

About the Show
Once again, NHK gave priority to Japanese artists, including rookie Chris Hart, who sang on stage with Seiko Matsuda. Other musical collaboration was between Nana Mizuki and T.M.Revolution. Other artists who debuted in Kouhaku are: Sexy Zone, NMB48, Shigeru Izumiya, Linked Horizon, Sakanaction, E-Girls and Miwa. Golden Bomber sang again "Memeshikute", who performed in 2012, but this time inspired by Olympic sports, due to the Tokyo city of choice to host the Olympic Games in 2020. Several artists presented "medleys", as in the case of AKB48, Masaharu Fukuyama, E-Girls, Exile, Momoiro Clover Z, Arashi and Seiko Matsuda. The traditional "Ootori" was made by veteran Saburo Kitajima, who declared that he would be participating for the 50th and last time the Kouhaku (the singer is 77 years old) and it is fair to sing "Matsuri" for being the last singer to perform before the announcement the winning team.

As tradition dictates, at the end of the event, all the artists sing "Hotaru no Hikari" with the regency of Masaaki Hirao. The ball system was used for the first time in seven years, and the winning team was the Shirogumi (9 votes against 4 Akagumi), accumulating 35 wins. Akagumi continues with 29 wins and have not won since 2011.

The average program audience (in the Kanto region) was approximately 44.5% being the highest since 2004. The program had audience peak of 51% during the final presentation of Saburo Kitajima. Other moments were the most watched Yuko Oshima graduation announcement during the presentation of AKB48 and participation of the cast of Ama-chan, one of the greatest successes of the Japanese TV in 2013

Performance order
This was the final time which Ayumi Hamasaki was the opening act for the Kouhaku.

Debuting or returning artists are in bold.

Songs Performed on medleys

References

2013 in Japanese music
2013 in Japanese television
NHK Kōhaku Uta Gassen events